SU College, Hilsa is a degree college in Bihar, India. It is a constituent unit of Patliputra University. The college offers Senior secondary education and Undergraduate degree in arts, science and conducts some vocational courses.

History 
The college was established in 1955. It became a constituent unit of Patliputra University in March 2018.

Degrees and courses 
The college offers the following degrees and courses.

 Senior Secondary
 Intermediate of Arts
 Intermediate of Science
 Bachelor's degree
 Bachelor of Arts
 Bachelor of Science
 Vocational courses
 Bachelor of Computer Application

References

External links 

 Patliputra University website

Constituent colleges of Patliputra University
Educational institutions established in 1955
Universities and colleges in Patna
1955 establishments in Bihar